Fred Fielding Willson (November 11, 1877 – August 13, 1956), most commonly known as Fred F. Willson, was an architect in Bozeman, Montana who designed many buildings that are listed on the National Register of Historic Places.

Early life
He was born in Bozeman, Montana on November 11, 1877, the son of American Civil War general Lester S. Willson and Emma Weeks Willson. After attending Bozeman public schools and the Bozeman Academy, he studied at Montana State College, for which he later designed buildings. Willson designed buildings on campus such as Hamilton Hall, the Student Union Building, the heating plant, Herrick Hall, the Chemistry Building, and Fort Ellis Ranch House. He left Montana State as a junior to attend Columbia University where he received his Bachelor of Arts in architecture in 1902.

Early career
After graduating from Columbia, Willson worked in Helena, Montana for architect C.S. Haire for two years. In November 1904, to broaden his architectural experiences, Willson started an extended tour of Europe, including France, Germany, Italy and the United Kingdom. He documented his impressions of European architecture and daily life in Europe during the early 20th century in his personal diaries. While in France, he studied at the Ecole des Beaux Arts in Paris.  Willson returned to New York in 1906 to work for the architecture firm Visscher & Burley. In late 1906, took charge of the offices of architects Link & Haire in Butte, Montana where he worked until returning to Bozeman in 1910.

Bozeman architecture
Fred Willson played a significant role in the architectural face of downtown Bozeman and surrounding residential areas.  His European experience significantly influences his designs which include representatives of multiple architectural styles--Georgian, Mission Revival, Art Deco and Craftsman. In 1927 Willson designed a new, three-story structure for Eagle's Store on the site of the original store built in West Yellowstone, Montana, in 1908. Willson donated his expertise in order to promote the National Park Service rustic architectural style.

Between January 1910 and 1928 Willson worked as an architect under his own name. Between 1928-1932 he was in the partnership of Shanley, Willson & Hugenin.  From 1932 until his death in 1956, Willson again was an independent architect. Many of his buildings are landmarks in downtown Bozeman—the Gallatin County Court House, the Baxter Hotel, the Hamill and Blackmore Apartments.  The Willson Middle School, originally the Gallatin County High School, was his design and now bears his name. An early design was the Gallatin County Jail (1911), which still remains today housing the Gallatin Historical Society and Pioneer Museum on Main Street.

In a 1954 address at Montana State University, Willson expressed his architectural philosophy:

Family and civic life
Willson was active in the Bozeman community and in professional organizations. He served as a member of the city council and the city commission.  He was a member of the Montana State Board of Architectural Examiners for Licensing, a Masonic Lodge and local Benevolent and Protective Order of Elks member. He also served as the Regional Director of the American Institute of Architects. Fred Willson married Helen Fisher on October 15, 1913. They had three children: Lester, Virginia and Beverly.  Willson died in Bozeman, Montana on August 13, 1956.  He is buried in the Willson family plot, Sunset Hills Cemetery, Bozeman.

Works and legacy
Between 1910 and his death in 1956, Willson was responsible for at least 330 architectural projects in Bozeman and other cities of Montana. Many of his projects are now listed on the National Register of Historic Places. His papers and many of his drawings are now held by Archives and Special Collections at the Montana State University Library.

NRHP listed works
Barrett Hospital, Chapman and S. Atlantic Streets, Dillon, Montana
Jack Bartlett House, 8 W. Harrison, Bozeman, Montana
Belgrade City Hall and Jail, Broadway at Northern Pacific Blvd., Belgrade, Montana, (1912)
Blackmore Apartments, 120 S. Black St., Bozeman, Montana
Bozeman Armory, 24 W. Mendenhall, Bozeman, Montana
Coca-Cola bottling plant that is part of the Bozeman Brewery Historic District, 700-800 N. Wallace St., Bozeman, Montana
Bozeman Sheet Metal Works, 26 S. Grand, Bozeman, Montana
Bozeman YMCA, 6 W. Babcock, Bozeman, Montana
Club Moderne, 811 E. Park 	Anaconda, Montana, (1937)
Dokken-Nelson Funeral Home, 113 S. Willson, Bozeman, Montana
Eagle's Store, 3 Canyon St., West Yellowstone, Montana
Emerson School, 111 S. Grand Ave., Bozeman, Montana
First Baptist Church, 120 S. Grand, Bozeman, Montana
Gallatin County Courthouse, 301 W. Main, Bozeman, Montana
Gallatin County High School, 404 W. Main, Bozeman, Montana
Gallatin County Jail, 317 W. Main St., Bozeman, Montana (1911)
Graf Building, 219—221 W. Arthur, Bozeman, Montana
Hamill Apartments, 427 E. Main, Bozeman, Montana
Hotel Baxter, 105 W. Main St., Bozeman, Montana
One or more works in Main Street Historic District, 100 block. W. Main-300 block. E. Main, Bozeman, Montana
One or more works in Northern Pacific-Story Mill Historic District, roughly bounded by the Northern Pacific Railroad right-of-way and the Story Mill spur line from Wye to Bridger Canyon Rd., Bozeman, Montana
Sacajawea Hotel, Three Forks, Montana
One or more works in South Tracy-South Black Historic District, 200-600 blocks. of S. Tracy & S. Black Aves., Bozeman, Montana
One or more works in South Willson Historic District, Willson Ave. between Curtiss and Arthur Streets., Bozeman, Montana
Story Motor Company, 202 W. Main, Bozeman, Montana

Other notable works
 Lehrkind Brewery Building, Bozeman, Montana
 Mary Innes School, Dillon, Montana

Notes

External links 

 Brief biographical note about the architecture firm Visscher & Burley. Gothic Revival at Lehigh: Lehigh University Special Collections Library Exhibits. 
 Collection 2143: Fred. F. Willson Papers, 1889-1956. Contains diaries, postcards, correspondence, printed materials, and architecture drawings. Held at Montana State University's Archives and Special Collections. 
 Historic Montana: Fred F. Willson. Details about eight of Willson's buildings, including the Hotel Baxter and the Gallatin County Courthouse in Bozeman, Montana. 

1877 births
1956 deaths
People from Bozeman, Montana
Columbia Graduate School of Architecture, Planning and Preservation alumni
American alumni of the École des Beaux-Arts
Architects from Montana
20th-century American architects
Notable residents of Montana